is a Japanese tokusatsu television series and the sixteenth installment in the long-running Super Sentai metaseries of superhero programs. Produced by Toei and Bandai, it aired on TV Asahi from February 21, 1992 to February 12, 1993, with a total of 50 episodes replacing Chōjin Sentai Jetman and was replaced by Gosei Sentai Dairanger. It was the first Sentai series to have a regular Sixth Ranger, and the first to introduce the concept of sentient, living mecha, a theme that has been used frequently in the franchise ever since. It was also the first Sentai series to be adapted into an installment of the American Power Rangers series. Footage from all 50 episodes was extensively used for the first season of Mighty Morphin Power Rangers. The core Zyuranger costumes were used in all three seasons of Mighty Morphin Power Rangers and were used as the original Power Rangers costumes while the Dragon Ranger costume was adapted into the Green Ranger's costume and was used throughout Season 1 and in early Season 2. The title Toei gives this series for international distribution is Galaxy Rangers.

Cast members from the series reprised their roles for the 2014 film, Zyuden Sentai Kyoryuger vs. Go-Busters: The Great Dinosaur Battle! Farewell Our Eternal Friends.

At the 2014 San Diego Comic Con, Shout! Factory announced that they would be releasing the entire Zyuranger series with English subtitles on DVD in North America. On February 17, 2015, "Super Sentai Zyuranger: The Complete Series" was released on DVD in North America. This is the first Super Sentai series to be released in North America. In addition on January 23, 2016, Shout Factory streamed the series on their website.

Plot

The five warriors, the Zyurangers, must summon the power of mechanical-looking deities known as Guardian Beasts, each modeled after a different prehistoric beast, in order to protect mankind from Bandora's evil forces. A sixth warrior, Burai the Dragon Ranger, later becomes involved with the conflict between the Zyurangers and Bandora's forces.

Cast

: 
: , played as 
: 
: 
: 
: 
Burai (young): 
: 
: 
: 
: 
: 
: 
Satoshi: 
Narrator:

Voice actors
: 
: 
: 
: 
, Dokiita Golems, Dora Cockatrice, Dora Cockatrice 2, Dora Silkis: 
 (30, 31 & 47-50): 
, Dora Narcissus: 
Dora Franke, Zombie Franke, Satan Franke: 
Dora Goldhorn:

Episodes

Songs
Opening theme

Lyrics: Gōji Tsuno & Reo Rinozuka
Composition: Gōji Tsuno
Arrangement: Kenji Yamamoto
Artist: Kenta Satō

Ending theme

Lyrics & Composition: Gōji Tsuno
Arrangement: Kenji Yamamoto
Artist: 
 Mecha themes
 "Daizyuzin No Uta" (大獣神のうた "Daizyuzin's Song")
 Artist: Ju-project
 "Dragon Caesar No Uta" (ドラゴンシーザーのうた Doragon Shīzā no uta, "Dragon Caesar's Song")
 Artist: Funky Y.K.
 Insert themes
 "Kibou No Tsurugi" (希望の剣 Kibō No Tsurugi, "Sword of Hope")
 Artist: Tomomi Hiraishi (平石豊 茂美 Hiraishi Tomomi)
 "Tyrannoranger ~Akaki Yuushi~" (ティラノレンジャー・「赤き勇姿」 Tiranorenjā "Akaki Yūshi", "Tyrannoranger -The Crimson Hero-")
 Artist: Tomomi Hiraishi (平石豊 茂美 Hiraishi Tomomi)
 "Yumemiru Otome No Chikara Kobu" (夢見る乙女の力こぶ "The Strength of a Dreaming Maiden")
 Artist: Sayuri Saito (斉藤 小百合 Saitō Sayuri)
 "Shippo Piki Piki" (しっぽ Piki Piki)
 Artist: Kenta Satou (佐藤 健太 Satō Kenta)
 "Pop Up Night" (ポップアップナイト Poppu Appu Naito)
 Artist: Takeshi Ike (池 毅 Ike Takeshi)
 Character theme
 "Dolla! ~Majo Bandora Theme~" (Dolla!~魔女バンドーラのテーマ~ Dora! !Majo Bandōra no Tēma~, "Dolla! ~Witch Bandora's Theme~")
 Artist: Bandora / Machiko Soga (曽我町子 Soga Machiko)

International Broadcasts and Home Video
In its' home country of Japan, this was the next series in the franchise to be given a full home video release after the success of Chōjin Sentai Jetman. It was released on VHS (both Sale/Rental) from April 1993 until February 1994 and spread across 11 volumes. The first seven volumes contain four episodes each. Volumes 8 and 9 contain 5 episodes, and the final two volumes contain 6 episodes. It was also released on Laserdisc from November 25, 1993 until January 25, 1994, as it was cancelled after two volumes were released, with each having four episodes. From September 21, 2010 until January 21, 2011, the series was released on DVD for the first time spreading through five volumes, with each one containing ten episodes each.
International releases were limited to a few Asian regions, as most regions around the world would receive foreign language dubs of the U.S.' adaptation based on this series, which was Mighty Morphin Power Rangers. 
In Thailand, three different Thai dubs have been confirmed to exist for Zyuranger. Two of them made for two different TV channels and one for home video. 
In Hong Kong, the series aired with a Cantonese Chinese dub on TVB Jade on July 9, 1994 until July 1, 1995, with all 50 episodes dubbed. 
In Indonesia, an Indonesian dub has been broadcast on Indosiar. 
In the Philippines despite the popularity of the Power Rangers, it was reported that the series has aired with a Tagalog dub on ABC (now TV5) in 1998 and continued airing until 2001.
In North America, the series was released on DVD by Shout! Factory presented with the original Japanese audio with English subtitles on February 17, 2015. This was the very first Super Sentai series to get an official release in its' unadapted Power Rangers form.

Video game
A Kyōryū Sentai Zyuranger video game was released for the Nintendo Famicom by Angel (a subsidiary of Bandai) on November 6, 1992. It is a side-scrolling action game in which the player takes control of a different Zyuranger in each of the game's five stages. The game includes two difficulty settings and a password feature.

The player begins the game as Boi in the first stage, followed by Mei, Dan, Goushi, and Geki in subsequent stages. Each Zyuranger begins his or her stage wielding the standard Ranger Gun, which can be replaced with the character's corresponding Legendary Weapon by finding the entrance to Barza's room in each stage. Each stage also contains ten scattered coins which will replenish the player's life gauge completely when fully collected, as well as display a still of the character's mecha and its specifications. At the end of each stage, the player will confront one of the main villains from the show. The villains faced are Pleprechuan, Bukbak, Totpat, Grifforzer and Bandora herself.

Between stages, the player will be challenged to one of three possible minigames by Burai the Dragonranger. These consist of a trivia game where Bandora will ask the player a question related to the TV series, a Pong-style game between Daizyuzin and the Dragon Caesar, and a hot potato-style game between Gōryūzin and Lamie. These minigames are also accessible from the main menu and can be played with a second player.

The series itself is also included in the Mobile game Super Robot Wars X-Ω as a limited-time event, making it the first Tokusatsu series to debut in a Super Robot Wars game.

Notes

References

External links

 
 Official Shout! Factory page
 Official Shout Factory TV page

Super Sentai
Television series about dinosaurs
1992 Japanese television series debuts
1993 Japanese television series endings
Japanese action television series
Japanese fantasy television series
Japanese science fiction television series
1990s Japanese television series
Prehistoric people in popular culture
Rogue planets in fiction